Hiapo (c. November 13, 1983 – February 25, 2004) was a male Atlantic bottlenose dolphin, who along with a companion female dolphin named Elele, as well as tankmates Phoenix and Akeakamai, were the subjects of Louis Herman's animal language studies at the Kewalo Basin Marine Mammal Laboratory in Honolulu, Hawaii, USA.  The most well known paper is the original work described in Herman, Richards, & Wolz (1984). Hiapo was also the subject of many other scientific studies of dolphin cognition and sensory abilities.

Physically identifying features of Hiapo included a five o'clock shadow on his throat, also sometimes described as the outline of a handsome dolphin tuxedo, a dorsal fin that drooped to the left,  and a particularly large fluke and tail. In the Hawaiian language, Hiapo means first-born son.

See also
 Animal Language
 Cetacean intelligence
 List of individual cetaceans

Notes

References

Media and Press Appearances

 Hiapo can be seen in: National Geographic's Dolphins with Robin Williams, BBC's Wildlife on One's Dolphins: Deep Thinkers with David Attenborough, ABC's Touched by a Dolphin with Sharon Lawrence, The Discoverers IMAX, Dolphins IMAX, and NOVA.

External links
The Dolphin Institute
Dolphin research publications. Not all include Hiapo.

1983 animal births
2004 animal deaths
Individual dolphins
Individual animals in the United States